The Jewish Neo-Aramaic dialect of Zakho is a dialect of Northeastern Neo-Aramaic originally spoken by Jews in Zakho, Iraq. Following the exodus of Jews from the Muslim lands, most speakers now live in Israel, principally Jerusalem and surrounding villages.

See also 
 Aramaic alphabet
 Betanure Jewish Neo-Aramaic
 Jewish languages

References

Bibliography
 Avenery, Iddo, The Aramaic Dialect of the Jews of Zakho. The Israel academy of Science and Humanities 1988.
 Heinrichs, Wolfhart (ed.) (1990). Studies in Neo-Aramaic. Scholars Press: Atlanta, Georgia. .
 Maclean, Arthur John (1895). Grammar of the dialects of vernacular Syriac: as spoken by the Eastern Syrians of Kurdistan, north-west Persia, and the Plain of Mosul: with notices of the vernacular of the Jews of Azerbaijan and of Zakhu near Mosul. Cambridge University Press, London.

External links 
 Kurdish jewish women life.

Endangered Afroasiatic languages
Languages of Iraq
Languages of Israel
Jewish Northeastern Neo-Aramaic dialects
Languages of Kurdistan